The 1963–64 Romanian Hockey League season was the 34th season of the Romanian Hockey League. Six teams participated in the league, and Steaua Bucuresti won the championship.

Regular season

External links
hochei.net

Rom
Romanian Hockey League seasons
1963–64 in Romanian ice hockey